Bernard Martin (born 19 February 1943) is a French sprinter. He competed in the men's 4 × 400 metres relay at the 1964 Summer Olympics.

References

1943 births
Living people
Athletes (track and field) at the 1964 Summer Olympics
French male sprinters
Olympic athletes of France
Place of birth missing (living people)